Mikhail Alexandrovich Leontovich (22 February 1903, St. Petersburg – 30 March 1981, Moscow) was a Soviet physicist, member of USSR Academy of Sciences, specializing in plasma and radiophysics.

He was awarded:
Three Orders of Lenin
Five Orders of the Red Banner of Labour
Lenin Prize

References

Further reading
 

1903 births
1981 deaths
Russian plasma physicists
Soviet physicists
Full Members of the USSR Academy of Sciences
Lenin Prize winners
Recipients of the Order of Lenin
Soviet dissidents